Ladulé Lako LoSarah (born March 26, 1987, in Davis, California) is a retired South Sudanese international footballer and current coach who last played for FC Inter Leipzig of the German NOFV-Oberliga, and the South Sudan national football team.

Career

Youth and college
LoSarah played at Claremont High School in Claremont, California, where he co-captained the varsity team alongside current USMNT player Tony Beltran before graduating in 2005. He attended Swarthmore College, playing for the Garnet soccer team. Upon graduating in 2009 with a degree in environmental science and French literature, he played for the newly formed San Diego Flash before moving abroad, becoming the first Swarthmore alumnus to play in the top division of any country.

Professional
Ladulé signed for FK Bregalnica Štip July 15, 2010, on a one-year deal and made his debut on August 14, 2010, in a league match versus FK Teteks.

LoSarah parted with his club on mutual terms and had a brief trial with FK Varnsdorf of the Czech 2. Liga who ultimately decided not to offer him a contract. He signed with his former club, the San Diego Flash, for the 2011 NPSL season.

International
LoSarah announced his desire, should the opportunity arise, to represent his father's homeland, South Sudan, at the international level.

In early 2012, Lako LoSarah was named to the candidate pool for the South Sudan national football team.

After strong performances in the 2013 AFC Cup and TPL Yamaha Division 1 League, Lako LoSarah was invited to the S.S.F.A. 2013 CECAFA Cup preparation camp, ultimately being selected for the 20 player roster of the South Sudan national football team.  He made his debut in a November 30, 2013 match versus the Kenya national football team.

Coaching
While in Illinois, LoSarah was head coach of FC Diablos, a United Premier Soccer League club based in Bloomington, Illinois.

LoSarah is currently assistant coach of the UC Riverside Highlanders men's soccer team.

Personal
He was born in Davis, California to an American mother and a South Sudanese refugee father, allowing him to represent either nation at the international level.

External links
 
 "Transfer to FK Bregalnica Štip" Sport MK football 14 July 2010.
 "Macedonian Football Website"
 "Swarthmore Soccer Profile"

References

1987 births
Living people
Swarthmore College alumni
American soccer players
Soccer players from California
Association football forwards
National Premier Soccer League players
San Diego Flash players
FK Bregalnica Štip players
Expatriate footballers in North Macedonia
African-American soccer players
American people of South Sudanese descent
American sportspeople of African descent
Sportspeople of South Sudanese descent
People with acquired South Sudanese citizenship
Expatriate footballers in Trinidad and Tobago
TT Pro League players
Central F.C. players
Expatriate footballers in Thailand
South Sudanese footballers
South Sudan international footballers
Pomona-Pitzer Sagehens men's soccer coaches
Illinois Wesleyan Titans men's soccer coaches
United Premier Soccer League coaches
Texas A&M International Dustdevils men's soccer coaches
South Sudanese expatriate footballers
American expatriate soccer players in Germany
American expatriate soccer players
American expatriate sportspeople in Thailand
Inter Leipzig players
21st-century African-American sportspeople
20th-century African-American people